Helmut Erik "Helm" Glöckler (13 January 1909 in Frankfurt am Main – 18 December 1993 same place) was a German amateur racing driver.

Biography
Glöckler raced a Deutsch-Bonnet in Formula 3 in 1951, and won the sports car racing event at the 1953 Eifelrennen with a new Porsche 550.

He also won the sports car class Alpine Cup trophy in the 1951 Österreichische Alpenfahrt rally driving a highly modified Renault 4CV.

He entered the 1953 German Grand Prix in an Equipe Anglaise Cooper, this being his one and only attempt at a World Championship race, but he blew his engine during qualifying and so did not compete in the race. Had he qualified for the race, he would be the first ever driver to use number 0 in a Formula One race, twenty years before Jody Scheckter became the first to race in number 0 at the 1973 Canadian Grand Prix.

He raced a Porsche 550 in the 1953 24 Hours of Le Mans with Hans Herrmann, and again in the 1954 24 Hours of Le Mans with Richard von Frankenberg.

Until recently, Helm Glöckler GmbH in Frankfurt bore his name, running a motorcycle dealer and workshop, and other enterprises.

Family
Glöckler's cousin Walter created the small Porsche powered spyder in 1951 that later inspired the factory to produce the Porsche 550.

Complete World Championship results
(key)

Sources
 World Championship results are derived from

References

External links 
https://web.archive.org/web/20060708222456/http://solitude-memorial.de/idx05.htm
http://www.500race.org/Period%20Results/Germany%20Results.htm#1951 

1909 births
1993 deaths
German racing drivers
German Formula One drivers
24 Hours of Le Mans drivers
World Sportscar Championship drivers

Porsche Motorsports drivers